Hullabaloo: Live at Le Zenith, Paris (also referred to as simply Hullabaloo) is a live video album by English alternative rock band Muse. The video documents the band's two performances at Le Zénith in Paris, France, on 28 and 29 October 2001 and features an additional disc of backstage footage. A soundtrack album for the video was also produced, entitled Hullabaloo Soundtrack.

Track listing
All songs were written and composed by Matthew Bellamy, except where noted.

"Introduction" (Sample of "What's He Building In There ?" by Tom Waits, 28 October) 
"Dead Star" (28 October)
"Micro Cuts" (29 October)
"Citizen Erased" (28 October)
"Sunburn" (Guitar version, 28 October)
"Showbiz" (28 October)
"Megalomania" (29 October)
"Darkshines" (Japanese DVD only, 28 October)
"Uno" (29 October)
"Screenager" (29 October)
"Feeling Good" (Leslie Bricusse, Anthony Newley, 29 October)
"Space Dementia" (29 October)
"In Your World" (28 October)
"Muscle Museum" (28 October)
"Cave" (29 October)
"New Born" (29 October)
"Hyper Music" (28 October)
"Agitated" (28 October)
"Unintended" (29 October)
"Plug In Baby" (29 October)
"Bliss" (28 October)

Personnel
Matthew Bellamy – lead vocals, guitar, piano
Christopher Wolstenholme – bass, backing vocals, guitar on "Unintended"
Dominic Howard – drums, percussion

Sales and certifications

References

Muse (band) video albums
Live video albums
2002 video albums
2002 live albums
Mushroom Records live albums
Mushroom Records video albums